"On Every Street" is the third single and title track from the album of the same name by English rock band Dire Straits.

No promotional video was made for the song. Its B-side is a track from the band's 1980 album Making Movies, "Romeo and Juliet". The song was also included on the 2005 compilation The Best of Dire Straits & Mark Knopfler: Private Investigations.

Track listing
7-inch single
 "On Every Street"
 "Romeo And Juliet"

Charts

References

1991 songs
1992 singles
Dire Straits songs
Song recordings produced by Mark Knopfler
Songs written by Mark Knopfler
Vertigo Records singles